Anthology is a collection of early material by the New Zealand band The Clean, most of which had previously been out of print and hard to find.  It was released by Flying Nun Records in 2002.

The band's early releases, which had been only available on vinyl in the early 1980s, are included in their entirety. Anthology opens with the two tracks from The Clean's debut single, Tally Ho!, all five tracks of the Boodle Boodle Boodle EP, and all seven from Great Sounds Great, Good Sounds Good, So-so Sounds So-so, Bad Sounds Bad, Rotten Sounds Rotten. "At the Bottom" and "Getting Older" were released as a 45" single in 1983.

Track listing

Charts

References

The Clean albums
2002 compilation albums
Flying Nun Records compilation albums